I Like Your Nerve is a 1931 American pre-Code romantic comedy film directed by William C. McGann, starring Douglas Fairbanks, Jr. and Loretta Young. Boris Karloff has a small role.

Plot
In Latin America, Larry O'Brien  (Douglas Fairbanks, Jr.) sees Diane Forsythe (Loretta Young) and quickly falls in love. She, however, is engaged to marry the much older Clive Lattimer (Edmund Breon). Larry discovers that her motive is to save her stepfather, Areal Pacheco (Henry Kolker), from being shot. Pacheco, the Minister of Finance, has embezzled $200,000 from the national treasury, and an audit is scheduled soon. Lattimer is extremely wealthy and willing to make up the shortfall in exchange for Diane.

To keep Larry from disrupting the arrangement, Pacheco has his butler Luigi (Boris Karloff) arrange Diane's kidnapping (to Lattimer's country estate). Larry rescues Diane and leaves her in the care of his friend, Archie Lester (Claud Allister). Then he telephones a newspaper to report his "ransom" demand of $200,000. Citizens demand Pacheco pay the sum, but Larry points out that Diane's fiancé is the only person in the country with access to that much money. Lattimer refuses at first, but soon caves in to the outrage. Larry collects the money at the arranged dropoff point and later presents it to Pacheco, who then cancels Diane's engagement to Lattimer.

Cast

See also
 Boris Karloff filmography

References

External links

1931 films
1931 romantic comedy films
1930s English-language films
American romantic comedy films
American black-and-white films
Films directed by William C. McGann
Warner Bros. films
1930s American films